The Progressive Conservative Party of Prince Edward Island is one of three major political parties on Prince Edward Island. The party and its rival, the Liberals, have alternated in power since responsible government was granted in 1851.

History
The policies of the Liberals and Progressive Conservatives (PCs) are very similar. The major differences are in their allegiances to federal parties and in personalities. The PC Party began as the Conservative Party of Prince Edward Island, and changed its name in 1942 to reflect the development of the federal Progressive Conservative Party.

The Progressive Conservatives formed the government in Prince Edward Island under Premier Pat Binns, starting in 1996. The party lost its bid for a fourth mandate in 2007.

In October 2010, following the resignation of Binns as party leader (in 2007), a leadership election was held. Jim Bagnall became interim leader of the party in 2010 when previous interim leader MLA Olive Crane resigned the post to seek the permanent leadership of the party.

Crane won the PC leadership in October 2010, and served for over two years. She resigned as party leader on 31 January 2013, and was succeeded by Steven Myers as interim leader.

Rob Lantz was elected leader of the party at a leadership election on February 28, 2015 at the University of Prince Edward Island Sports Centre, but resigned on September 23, 2015 after failing to win a seat in the 2015 provincial election.

On October 15, 2015 the party chose Borden-Kinkora MLA Jamie Fox as interim leader

James Aylward, MLA for Stratford-Kinlock, defeated Brad Trivers and was chosen leader on October 19, 2017 replacing interim leader Jamie Fox.

On September 17, 2018 Aylward announced his pending resignation as leader, effective upon the election of his successor on February 9, 2019.

Dennis King was elected leader of the party, succeeding Aylward.

Traditionally, the Tories have done better among Protestant voters, while Liberals have had more support from Catholics. Politics on the island, however, has never been sectarian, and both parties have always had voters and members from both populations. Indeed, it has been the custom until recently for a Liberal incumbent of one denomination to be opposed by a Tory challenger of the same denomination and vice versa. This had tended to minimise religious sectarianism within the parties. The Liberals have also traditionally enjoyed the support of the province's small Acadian population concentrated in Prince County at the west end of the island. Conservative support has tended to be greater on the eastern half of the island.

Current MLAs
 James Aylward, Stratford-Keppoch
 Zack Bell, Charlottetown-Winsloe
 Darlene Compton, Belfast-Murray River
 Natalie Jameson, Charlottetown-Hillsborough Park
 Cory Deagle, Montague-Kilmuir
 Jamie Fox, Borden-Kinkora
 Ernie Hudson, Alberton-Bloomfield
 Dennis King, Brackley-Hunter River
 Colin LaVie, Souris-Elmira
 Sidney MacEwen, Morell-Donagh
 Mark McLane, Cornwall-Meadowbank
 Matthew MacKay, Kensington-Malpeque
 Steven Myers, Georgetown-Pownal
 Bloyce Thompson, Stanhope-Marshfield
 Brad Trivers, Rustico-Emerald

Conservative and PC leaders

See also
Progressive Conservative Party of Prince Edward Island leadership elections
 List of premiers of Prince Edward Island
 List of political parties in Canada
 Politics of Prince Edward Island

References

External links
 Progressive Conservative Party of Prince Edward Island
 PC Youth of PEI

Conservative parties in Canada
Organizations based in Charlottetown
Progressive Conservative Party
Political parties established in 1851
1851 establishments in Prince Edward Island
Green conservative parties